Abu Shenan may refer to:
 Abu Shenan-e Sofla